Rahim Ali (born 21 April 2000) is an Indian professional footballer who plays as a forward for Indian Super League club Chennaiyin and the India national team.

Career

Earlier career
Born in Barrackpore, West Bengal, Ali was part of the AIFF Elite Academy batch that was preparing for the 2017 FIFA U-17 World Cup to be hosted in India. After the tournament, Ali was selected to play for the Indian Arrows, an All India Football Federation-owned team that would consist of India under-20 players to give them playing time. He made his professional debut for the side in the Arrow's first match of the season against Chennai City. He came on as a 73rd-minute substitute for Rahul Praveen as Indian Arrows won 3–0.

Chennaiyin
On 31 May 2019, Ali signed with Chennaiyin and appeared in the 2019–20 Indian Super League. They lost to Odisha on 6 January 2020 and won a game against Hyderabad by 3–1.

International
Ali represented the India under-17 side which participated in the 2017 FIFA U-17 World Cup, which was hosted in India.

Ali made his senior international debut for India against Nepal in an international friendly on 2 September 2021 in their 1–1 draw. He later participated in 2021 SAFF Championship in Maldives, in which they emerged champions. In March 2022, Ali was included in national squad by coach Igor Štimac ahead of India's two friendly matches against Bahrain and Belarus as preparations of 2023 AFC Asian Cup final round qualification.

Career statistics

Club

International

Honours 

Club
Chennaiyin
 Indian Super League runner-up: 2019–20

'''International
India

 SAFF Championship: 2021

References

External links
Rahim Ali at Sportskeeda

2000 births
Living people
People from North 24 Parganas district
Indian footballers
AIFF Elite Academy players
Indian Arrows players
Association football forwards
Footballers from West Bengal
I-League players
India youth international footballers
Indian Super League players
Chennaiyin FC players
India international footballers